|}

The Clonmel Oil Chase is a Grade 2 National Hunt steeplechase in Ireland which is open to horses aged four years or older. It is run at Clonmel over a distance of about 2 miles and 4 furlongs (2 miles 4 furlongs and 51 yards, or 4,070 metres), and it is scheduled to take place each year in November.

The event is named after its sponsor, the Clonmel Oil Company. It was first run in 1992 over 3 miles in December and was initially known as the Morris Oil Chase.  It was cut by half a mile in 1994, and at the same time it was moved to November. The race was given Grade 3 status in 1995, and it was promoted to Grade 2 level the following year. It was first run under its present title in 2003.

Records
Most successful horse (4 wins):
 Dorans Pride – 1997, 1998, 1999, 2000

Most successful jockey (4 wins):
 Paul Townend – Champagne Fever (2014), Kemboy (2018), Douvan (2019), Blue Lord (2022)

Most successful trainer (7 wins): 
 Willie Mullins - Arvika Ligeonniere (2013), Champagne Fever (2014), Alelchi Inois (2016), Kemboy (2018), Douvan (2019), Bachasson (2020), Blue Lord (2022)

Winners

See also
 Horse racing in Ireland
 List of Irish National Hunt races

References

 Racing Post:

 pedigreequery.com – Clonmel Oil Chase – Clonmel.

National Hunt races in Ireland
National Hunt chases
Clonmel Racecourse